Grand is a commune in the Vosges department in Grand Est in northeastern France.

Grand is known for its Roman amphitheatre, mosaics and aqueduct. It was the site of the coronation of Holy Roman Emperor Charles the Fat in 885.

See also 
 Communes of the Vosges department

References

External links 

 Grand: a prestigious Gallo-Roman sanctuary

Communes of Vosges (department)
Champagne (province)